Agricultural technology or agrotechnology (abbreviated agtech, agritech, AgriTech, or agrotech)  is the use of technology in agriculture, horticulture, and aquaculture with the aim of improving yield, efficiency, and profitability. Agricultural technology can be products, services or applications derived from agriculture that improve various input/output processes.

Advances in agricultural science, agronomy, and agricultural engineering have led to applied developments in agricultural technology.

History

The history of agriculture has been shaped by technological advances. Historians have described a number of agricultural revolutions, which identify major shifts in agricultural practice and productivity. These revolutions have been closely connected to technological improvements. Irrigation technology was developed independently by a number of different cultures, with the earliest known examples dated to the 6th millennium BCE in Khuzistan in the south-west of present-day Iran.

A major turning point for agricultural technology is the Industrial Revolution, which introduced agricultural machinery to mechanise the labour of agriculture, greatly increasing farm worker productivity. In modern mechanised agriculture powered machinery has replaced many farm jobs formerly carried out by manual labour or by working animals such as oxen, horses and mules.

Advances in the 19th century included the development of modern weather forecasting and invention of barbed wire. Improvement to portable engines and threshing machines led to their widespread adoption.

The 20th century saw major advances in agricultural technologies, including the development of synthetic fertilizers and pesticides, and new agricultural machinery including mass produced tractors and agricultural aircraft for aerial application of pesticides. More recent advances have included agricultural plastics, genetically modified crops, improved drip irrigation, and soilless farming techniques such as hydroponics, aquaponics, and aeroponics.

In the first decades of the 21st century, Information Age technologies have been increasingly applied to agriculture. Agricultural robots, agricultural drones and driverless tractors have found regular use on farms, while digital agriculture and precision agriculture make use of extensive data collection and computation to improve farm efficiency. Precision agriculture includes such areas as precision beekeeping, precision livestock farming, and
precision viticulture.

Modern Agricultural Technology Tools

Climate Monitoring 

 Weather forecasting
 IoT-based Sensors Networks

Nutrition Management 

 Digital Soil Analysis Devices
 Soil moisture sensors

Irrigation Management 

 Automated irrigation
 Irrigation Recommendations

Pest and Disease Management 

 Digital Pheromone Traps

Crop Inspection 

 Crop Monitoring via Satellite
 Geographic Information Systems (GIS)

Farm Management 

 Farm Management System

Digital Market Intelligence 

 CropMap

Hydroponics

Vertical Farming

Agricultural Drones

Agro-textiles 
Agro-textiles is the segmented class of technical textiles that deals focuses on the agriculture sector, with an approach to  crop protection and crop development and reducing the risks of farming practices. Primarily agro-textiles offer weather resistance and resistance to microorganisms and protection from unwanted elements and external factors. Agro-textiles helps to improve the overall conditions with which crop can develop and be protected. There are the various textile products, fabrics forms, fibers and techniques used in agro-textiles which are useful for agriculture mainly for crop protection and in crop development for instance shade nets, thermal insulation and sunscreen materials, windshield, antibird nets, which provide minimal shading and proper temperature, air circulation for protecting plants from direct sunlight and  birds. Agrotextiles involves mulch mats, hail protection nets, and crop covers, etc. Agro-textiles are useful in Horticulture, aquaculture, landscape gardening and forestry also. More examples of use and application are covering livestock protection, suppressing weed and insect control, etc.

More technologies and applications
 Bird control 
 Bird netting
 Satellite photography and sensors
 Phase tracking
 Light and heat control
 Soil management and other involved analytical tasks
 Biotech
 Hydroponics, soilless farming technology

See also
 Agricultural aircraft
 Agricultural engineering
 Agricultural machinery
 Atomic gardening
 Automatic milking
 Controlled-environment agriculture
 Data mining in agriculture
 Food technology
 Information and communications technology in agriculture
 Optical sorting
 Plasticulture
 Technology and society
 Timeline of cellular agriculture

References

 
Technology in society